Kyrbissos was a town of ancient Caria or of Ionia; the ethnonym was Κυρβισσεύς. It was a member of the Delian League since it appears in tribute records of Athens between the years 454/3 and 445/3 BCE paying a phoros of 2000 drachmae. It appears again in a tribute decree of Athens dated to 425/4 BCE. A treaty dated to the 3rd century BCE documents a sympoliteia between Kyrbissos and Teos such that Kyrbissos would be absorbed by Teos but would continue to exist and not be destroyed.
 
Its site is unlocated.

References

Populated places in ancient Caria
Populated places in ancient Ionia
Former populated places in Turkey
Members of the Delian League
Lost ancient cities and towns